This is a list of rivers of Greenland.   Greenland is an autonomous territory within the Kingdom of Denmark, located between the Arctic and Atlantic oceans, east of the Canadian Arctic Archipelago.  Most rivers in Greenland are formed from melting of glaciers.

Eastern coast 
 Børglum Elv (largest river), 
 Gudenelv, 
 Marrakajik (Schuchert River), 
 Primulaelv, 
 Zackenberg Bay,

Western coast 
 Akuliarusiarsuup Kuua,  
 Isortup Kuua
 Isuitsup Kuua (Igassup Kuua), 
 Kapisillit River
 Majorqaq, 
 Minturn Elv (Minturn River), 
 Pinguarsuup Alannguata Kuussua
 Qinnguata Kuussua, 
 Rode Eleve or Rodelv (Yellow River), 
 Sarfartooq (Sarfortok River),

Southern tip 
 Kangia River
 Narsaq River,  (approximately)
 Narsarsuaq (Narsarssuak River),  
 Tosuut River

See also
List of rivers of the Americas by coastline

References

Greenland
Rivers of Greenland